Nursallia is an extinct genus of pycnodontid ray-finned fishes, ranging from the Late Cretaceous period until its extinction during the Eocene.

References

 Studies on Mexican Paleontology (Topics in Geobiology) by Francisco J. Vega, Torrey G. Nyborg, María del Carmen Perrilliat, and Marisol Montellano-Ballesteros (page 179)
P. L. Forey, L. Yi, C. Patterson and C. E. Davis. 2003. Fossil fishes from the Cenomanian (Upper Cretaceous) of Namoura, Lebanon. Journal of Systematic Palaeontology 1(4):227-330

Pycnodontiformes genera
Cretaceous bony fish
Paleocene fish
Eocene fish
Prehistoric fish of Europe
Fossil taxa described in 1987
Eocene genus extinctions
Cenomanian genus first appearances